Tony Mansfield (born 19 January 1955) is an English songwriter, musician and record producer.

Early work

Mansfield was born in Wimbledon, London, and became best known as the main songwriter/producer for New Musik, a synthpop band that performed from 1979 to 1982. Following their debut hit single "Straight Lines" in 1979, the band had three further UK Top 40 hits in 1980 ("This World of Water", "Sanctuary" and "Living By Numbers"), and released three albums: From A To B (1980), Anywhere (1981) and Warp (1982). The group also released a compilation album for the United States in 1981 known as Sanctuary which consisted of tracks from the first two albums. After the demise of GTO Records, New Musik disbanded.

Productions and collaborations
Mansfield's career as a freelance producer had begun pre-New Musik in the late 1970s, and after the demise of his band he turned exclusively to production. Mansfield became skilled in the use of the Fairlight CMI and used it extensively throughout the 1980s for production and pre-production.  During this time he worked on a number of successful albums and singles for various artists in the 1980s, most notably Naked Eyes, Captain Sensible (which included writing credits on hits such as "Glad It's All Over", "There Are More Snakes Than Ladders" and "One Christmas Catalogue"), the debut album Hunting High and Low by a-ha, XXX by Miguel Bosé, Showpeople by Mari Wilson, Bouncing off the Satellites by The B-52's, Vicious Pink, Jean Paul Gaultier and After The Fire.

In the 1990s he produced the No.1 debut album Puntos Cardinales for Ana Torroja and in 2001, Online for the Latvian band Brainstorm amongst other production works.
 
Mansfield's work has featured in various television productions, advertisements and films including Earth Girls Are Easy (1988), Romy and Michele's High School Reunion (1997) and Hysterical Blindness (2002).

References

External links
 Tony Mansfield page by Jonas Wårstad
 Unofficial homepage
 

1955 births
Living people
English songwriters
English male singers
English new wave musicians
English record producers
People from Wimbledon, London
British synth-pop new wave musicians
Musicians from London
Aztec Camera members
British male songwriters